Atrium String Quartet is a Russian string quartet and one of the leading young ensembles.
Quartet founded in 2000 in St Petersburg.

Atrium Quartet is the prize-winner of several International Competitions including First Prizes of IX London International String Quartet Competition in 2003 and VII Bordeaux International String Quartet Competition in 2007. Recordings (EMI, Zig-Zag Territoires, Oclassica, Columna Musica, Profil Haenssler) of the quartet include works by Haydn, Mozart, Beethoven, Brahms, Debussy, Shostakovich, Tchaikovsky, Yuri Falik and Jordi Cervelló (his "A Bach" and "St Petersburg" quartets dedicated to the members of the Atrium Quartet). In 2013 Quartet performed all 15 quartets by Dmitry Shostakovich in one single day. Concerts of this unique project called "Shostakovich Marathon" took place in Japan, Iceland, France and Germany. The members of the quartet uses all-gut strings for the 19th century repertoire, including Beethoven, Brahms and Tchaikovsky.  
Russian-born quartet currently resides in Berlin, Germany

Members 

 Violin I: Nikita Boriso-Glebsky (from 2017)
Sergey Malov (2015-2017); Alexey Naumenko (2000-2015)
 Violin II: Anton Ilyunin, (since 2000)
 Viola: Dmitry Pitulko (since 2004); Dmitry Usov (2000-2004)
 Violoncello: Anna Gorelova (since 2000)

External links
 Official web-page
 Official Facebook page
 Twitter

Russian string quartets
Musical groups established in 2000